Mariusz Malinowski is a Polish electrical engineer. Professor in the Institute of Control and Industrial Electronics at Warsaw University of Technology.

Biography 

Mariusz Malinowski received the Ph.D. degree with honors in Electrical Engineering from the Warsaw University of Technology (WUT) in 2001 for his thesis entitled "Sensorless control strategies for three-phase PWM rectifiers". He then attained a habilitation for monothematic publications entitled "Selected problems of modulation and control for two- and multilevel voltage source converters with PWM" in 2012. He is employed as professor at WUT.

His public service include activity in IEEE (Institute of Electrical and Electronics Engineers), where he was editor-in-chief of IEEE Industrial Electronics Magazine during 2010-2012 (Award of Excellence given by Society for Technical Communications), Associate Editor of IEEE Transactions on Industrial Electronics since 2005, and Associate Editor of IEEE Transactions on Power Electronics since 2012. He has served as a co-organizer over 20 international conferences from 2003 to 2016. He is currently chair of IEEE Poland Section and vice president in IEEE Industrial Electronics Society. He has in IEEE highest fellow status.

Mariusz Malinowski participated in the development of technologies which received many prizes e.g. three times the recognition in the competition Polish Product of the Future organized by the Polish Agency for Enterprise Development (PARP), the Grand Prix of TECHNICON, the Gold Medal of Automaticon, the Grand Prix Exhibition of Innovations in Geneva (Gold Medal), the Exhibition in Brussels "Eureco" (Bronze Medal), International Exhibition of Inventions in Warsaw (Silver Medal) and special prize of Polish Ministry of Economy "eCO2 Innovation" for development of ecological innovative product. Mariusz Malinowski with team received also Scientific Award of Warsaw University of Technology in 2015 for achievements in field of technology transfer to industry.

He was visiting scholar and professor in following institutions: Aalborg University (Denmark), University of Nevada (Reno, USA), Technical University of Berlin (Germany), Universidad Tecnica Federico Santa Marıa  (Valparaıso, Chile), University of Cergy-Pontoise (France), ENSEEIHT - Laplace, Toulouse (France) and ETH Zurich (Switzerland).

He has participated in over 20 research and industrial projects (11 in a leader role) and he has been a reviewer and PhD commission member for numerous PhD theses in Germany, Spain, Denmark, Australia, India and Poland.

Publications 

Mariusz Malinowski has published over 150 journal and conference papers. His total number of citations according to Google Scholar is over 5000. He is the co-author of four patents (two implemented by industry) and co-author of five books: "Control in Power Electronics" (New York: Academic Press, 2002), "Industrial Electronics Handbook" (Taylor & Francis Group – USA, 2011), "Selbstgeführte Stromrichter am Gleichspannung-szwischenkreis: Funktion, Modulation und Regelung" (Springer Verlag, 2012), "Advanced and Intelligent Control in Power Electronics and Drives" (Springer, Switzerland, 2014) and "Power Electronic Converters and Systems" (IET Press – UK, 2016 ). Moreover, he is co-editor of book "Power Electronics for Renewable Energy Systems, Transportation and Industrial Applications" (IEEE Press, Wiley, 2014).

Awards 

Mariusz Malinowski has been granted the following awards and distinguishments: best paper award at The 26th Annual Conference of the IEEE Industrial Electronics Society (Nagoya, Japan) in 2000, a scholarship for young researchers (Start Program) from the Foundation for Polish Science (FNP) in 2001 and 2002, the Siemens Prize for his PhD thesis in 2002, a scholarship from the FNP (Kolumb Program) to work for one year as visiting scientist at the Technical University of Berlin in 2003, a Polish Minister of Science and Higher Education award for his contribution to the book Control in Power Electronic in 2003, paper award at the International Conference on Power Electronics and Motion Control - EPE-PEMC`2004 (Riga, Latvia), seven-times recipient of the WUT Rector Prize (2000-2015), the Siemens Prize for research achievements in 2007, the Polish Minister of Science and Higher Education awards for research achievements in 2008, and the Prime Minister of Poland award for habilitation in 2013.

Moreover, he received the international IEEE IES David Irwin Early Career Award for "Outstanding research and development of modulation and control for industrial electronics converters" in 2011 (Melbourne, Australia) and IEEE IES David Bimal Bose Award for Industrial Electronics Applications in Energy Systems for "Contributions in control of industrial electronics converters applications in energy systems" in 2015 (Yokohama, Japan).

References

External links 
 Mariusz Malinowski on Google Scholar

Polish engineers
Living people
20th-century births
Fellow Members of the IEEE
Warsaw University of Technology alumni
Academic staff of the Warsaw University of Technology
Year of birth missing (living people)